Massachusetts House of Representatives' 14th Bristol district in the United States is one of 160 legislative districts included in the lower house of the Massachusetts General Court. It covers part of Bristol County. Democrat Adam Scanlon has represented the district since 2021.

Locales represented
The district includes the following localities:
 part of Attleboro
 part of Mansfield
 North Attleborough

The current district geographic boundary overlaps with those of the Massachusetts Senate's Bristol and Norfolk district and Norfolk, Bristol and Middlesex district.

Representatives
 John S. Ames, III 
 Theodore J. Aleixo, Jr.
 Kevin Poirier
 Elizabeth A. Poirier, 2000-2021
Adam Scanlon 2021-current

See also
 List of Massachusetts House of Representatives elections
 List of Massachusetts General Courts
 Other Bristol County districts of the Massachusetts House of Representatives: 1st, 2nd, 3rd, 4th, 5th, 6th, 7th, 8th, 9th, 10th, 11th, 12th, 13th
 List of former districts of the Massachusetts House of Representatives

Images
Portraits of legislators

References

External links
 Ballotpedia
  (State House district information based on U.S. Census Bureau's American Community Survey).

House
Government of Bristol County, Massachusetts